Dubňany is a town in Hodonín District in the South Moravian Region of the Czech Republic. It has about 6,200 inhabitants.

Geography
It lies in a flat landscape of the Lower Morava Valley. The Kyjovka River flows west of the town and supplies several fish ponds. The Jaroševický pond has an area of almost  and is one of the largest bodies of water in the region.

History
The first written mention of Dubňany is from 1349. Dubňany became economically significant in the 19th century, when coal mining and glassmaking developed. It was promoted to a town in 1964.

Demographics

Economy
In Dubňany is one of the largest photovoltaic power stations in the Czech Republic.

Sights
The most important monument is the Church of Saint Joseph from 1885.

Notable people
Ludwig Dupal (1913–?), football player and manager
Ludvík Podéšť (1921–1968), composer and conductor

References

External links

Cities and towns in the Czech Republic
Populated places in Hodonín District
Moravian Slovakia